Catocala bokhaica is a moth of the family Erebidae first described by Vladimir S. Kononenko in 1979. It is found in Primorye in the Russian Far East, North Korea and China.

References

External links
Catocala of Asia

bokhaica
Moths of Asia
Moths described in 1979